Deborah Ann Hockley  (born 7 November 1962) is a New Zealand former cricketer who played as a right-handed batter and right-arm medium bowler. Hockley was the first woman to become President of New Zealand Cricket.

Domestic career
Hockley played domestic cricket for Canterbury and North Shore.

International career
Hockley appeared in 19 Test matches for New Zealand, making a high score of 126 not out and averaging 52.04 with the bat. Hockley captained New Zealand in six Tests, drawing them all. She also appeared in 118 One Day Internationals for New Zealand, averaging 41.89 with the bat. She captained 27 of them, winning 12 and losing 15. She was also Player of the Match in the World Cup final in India in 1997 and holds the record for scoring the most runs by any woman in the ICC Women's Cricket World Cup (1501),  playing in five World Cups.

Hockley was the first woman to reach 4000 ODI runs and to play 100 ODIs. She was also the first woman to score 1,000 runs in ODIs for New Zealand. Her international career spanned from 1979 to 2000.

International centuries

Test centuries

One Day International centuries

Honours 
In the 1999 New Year Honours, Hockley was appointed a Member of the New Zealand Order of Merit, for services to cricket. She was the fourth woman to be inducted into the ICC Cricket Hall of Fame in 2013. Her final WODI appearance was in the final of the 2000 Women's Cricket World Cup.

In 2016 she was the first woman to be elected president of New Zealand Cricket in its 122-year history.

In the 2021 New Year Honours, Hockley was promoted to Companion of the New Zealand Order of Merit, for services to cricket. In 2023, the award for New Zealand's most outstanding female cricketer of the year, the Debbie Hockley Medal, was named in her honour.

See also 
 List of centuries in women's One Day International cricket
 List of centuries in women's Test cricket

References

External links
 
 

1962 births
Living people
Cricketers from Christchurch
Companions of the New Zealand Order of Merit
New Zealand women cricketers
New Zealand women Test cricketers
New Zealand women One Day International cricketers
New Zealand women cricket captains
New Zealand women's Test captains
New Zealand women's One Day International captains
Canterbury Magicians cricketers
North Shore women cricketers